Gabriel Hernández (born 19 November 1949) is a Mexican racewalker. He competed in the men's 50 kilometres walk at the 1972 Summer Olympics.

References

1949 births
Living people
Athletes (track and field) at the 1972 Summer Olympics
Mexican male racewalkers
Olympic athletes of Mexico
Place of birth missing (living people)
Pan American Games medalists in athletics (track and field)
Pan American Games silver medalists for Mexico
Athletes (track and field) at the 1971 Pan American Games
Medalists at the 1971 Pan American Games
20th-century Mexican people